Fructose bisphosphatase may refer to:
 Fructose 1,6-bisphosphatase (when the term "Fructose bisphosphatase" is used without qualification, this is more frequently what is meant)
 Fructose 2,6-bisphosphatase